The Stoneman Murders is a Bengali web series streaming on hoichoi. The story is basically inspired by true events, a serial killer who killed several people in the year of 1985 to 1989 in Mumbai and Calcutta and remained unidentified. The murderer is known as the Stoneman as he uses a stone to kill people. Rajatabha Dutta, Rupankar Bagchi and Swastika Mukherjee are the lead actors in the series. The Story starts with a train journey of journalist Sneha who finds the Stoneman's diary. This diary makes her curious to find out all the details about the Stoneman.

Cast 
 Rajatava Dutta 
 Swastika Mukherjee as Sneha
 Rupankar Bagchi
 Pallab Kumar Das

Episodes

Season 1 (2019)
Season 1 of The Stoneman Murders was released on 13 September 2019 with 4 episodes, streaming on Bengali OTT platform Hoichoi. Season finale premiered on 20 September on hoichoi platform.

Episodes

References

External links

Indian web series
2017 web series debuts
Bengali-language web series
Hoichoi original programming